Jargisu Ibrahim born (9 September 1949) is a Ghanaian politician and a former member of Parliament for the Kumawu constituency
in the Ashanti region. He represented his constituency in the first Parliament of the fourth Republic of Ghana.

Early life and education 
Ibrahim was born on 9 September 1949 at Peminase in the Ashanti Region of Ghana. He attended Tweneboah Kodua Secondary School and the King Saud University where he obtained his Bachelor of Arts in Linguistics.

Politics 
Ibrahim was first elected into Parliament on the Ticket of the National Democratic Congress during the December 1992 Ghanaian parliamentary election for the Kumawu Constituency in the Ashanti Region of Ghana.  He polled 5,862 votes to win the seat. He was defeated by Reo Addai Basoah of the New Patriotic Party who polled 15,025 representing 49.60% votes out of the total valid votes cast over his opponents Jargisu Ibrahim who polled 9,354 votes representing 30.90%, and Ernest Boakye Yiadom of the People's National Convention who also polled 532 votes representing 1.80%.

Career 
Ibrahim is a clerk by profession and a former member of Parliament for the Kumawu Constituency in the Ashanti Region of Ghana.

Personal life 
Ibrahim is a Muslim (Islam).

References 

Living people
1949 births
National Democratic Congress (Ghana) politicians
King Saud University alumni
People from Ashanti Region
Ghanaian MPs 1993–1997
Clerks
Ghanaian Muslims
21st-century Ghanaian politicians